Begunovskaya is a rural locality (a village) in Rakulo-Kokshengskoye Rural Settlement of Velsky District, Arkhangelsk Oblast, Russia. The population was 8 as of 2014.

Geography 
Begunovskaya is located 54 km east of Velsk (the district's administrative centre) by road. Ulasovskaya is the nearest rural locality.

References 

Rural localities in Velsky District